Mike Sheridan (born 25 October 1991) is a Danish DJ and producer of electronic music.

Career 
Sheridan began producing music at the age of eight, and was signed by an indie label when he was 14 years old. At the age of 15 he had already appeared on multiple compilations, showcased his music on national TV, played over 70 gigs at clubs that required him to be accompanied by a parent and released his first EP, "Alt & Intet", on MIS Records. 

His debut album, I Syv Sind, came out on Playground Music Scandinavia in 2008 and won a Danish Grammy for "Best Electronica Album", spending six weeks on national record chart. His single "Med Små Skridt" spent several months at number 1 on iTunes Denmark.

In 2009, Sheridan played at Roskilde, one of the five largest annual European music festivals.

Discography

Studio albums

EPs

Singles

References

External links

Interviews 
Mike Sheridan - Studio setup TC Electronic (May 4, 2010)
Human Dynamic: an interview with electronica composer/ DJ Mike Sheridan-Part I Lode Plus (December 7, 2011)
Mike Sheridan on the Red Roof Valo.TV (2012)

1991 births
Living people
Danish electronic musicians
Musicians from Copenhagen